Solifer Oy is a Finnish manufacturer of bicycles, boats, mopeds, and travel trailers. The company was founded in 1954 and it started as a dynamo manufacturer. Nowadays, the company's bicycles are manufactured in Poland, boats in Finland, mopeds in China, and travel trailers in Dorotea, Sweden.

Mopeds 

Alongside Tunturi, Solifer was one of the significant moped manufactures in Finland from the late 1950s to the mid-1980s. During 1958–1984, around 175,000 Solifer mopeds were manufactured, of which over 20,000 were exported outside Finland.  Solifer was distributed by AB Bensow Oy - Managing Director Stig Gunnar Damstrom.

With c.1,200 registrations in the first half-year of 2010, China-manufactured Solifer BT49QT was the most registered moped in Finland at that time.

References

Further reading

External links 
 
 

Vehicle manufacturing companies established in 1954
Cycle manufacturers of Finland
Finnish boat builders
Finnish brands
Moped manufacturers
Motor vehicle manufacturers of Finland
Finnish companies established in 1954
1954 establishments in Finland